The Quadruple Alliance was formed by the monarchist Great Powers of Austria, Prussia, Russia, and Great Britain to counter the military and revolutionary republican political threats posed by the expansion of the First French Empire under Napoleon I and to fight the War of the Seventh Coalition. In the wake of the final defeat of Napoleon at the Battle of Waterloo on 18 June 1815, the alliance was formalized with the signing of the Treaty of Paris on 20 November 1815. It renewed the use of the Congress System which sought to stabilize European international relations at the time and pledged each signatory to a military alliance that ultimately aimed to crush any recurrence of revolutionary outbreaks like those that led to the French Revolution if they occurred anywhere in Europe.  The quadruple alliance lasted until 1818, by which time the restoration of the Bourbon monarchy enabled France - now a constitutional monarchy ruled by King Louis XVIII - to join the Quadruple Alliance, turning it into the Quintuple Alliance.

See also

Treaty of Paris (1815)
Concert of Europe
Holy Alliance

References

Further reading
 Nichols, Irby Coghill. The European Pentarchy and the Congress of Verona, 1822 (Springer Science & Business Media, 2012).

Late modern Europe
History of Europe
Military alliances involving the United Kingdom
Military alliances involving Austria
Military alliances involving Prussia
Military alliances involving Russia
19th-century military alliances
1815 treaties
1815 in Europe
Treaties of the Russian Empire
Treaties of the Austrian Empire
Treaties of the Kingdom of Prussia
1815 in the United Kingdom
1815 in the Austrian Empire
1815 in Prussia
1815 in the Russian Empire
Treaties of the United Kingdom (1801–1922)

de:Pentarchie
nn:Kvadrupelalliansen
pl:Quadruple Alliance
fi:Kvadrupelallianssi